Hamat is a village in Lebanon.  It is located 287 meters atop the historic cape of Theoprosopon.  It is home to the historic shrine and monastery of Our Lady of Nourieh.  The village is also home to Saint Elias Church, which overlooks the Jawz River, or the River of Walnuts and the ancient Phoenician coastal town of Batroun. The locals are Orthodox Christians.

References

External links
Hamat, Localiban

Batroun District
Populated places in the North Governorate
Eastern Orthodox Christian communities in Lebanon